John Robertson MBE (1867 – 14 February 1926) was a Labour Party politician in the United Kingdom.

He began work in the coal mines as a boy of thirteen, eventually becoming Chairman of the Scottish Miners' Union. He was unsuccessful parliamentary candidate for the Bothwell constituency in Lanarkshire at the 1918 general election and was elected as Member of Parliament for the constituency in a 1919 by-election, holding the seat until his death.

He served as a Lord Commissioner of the Treasury, in the short-lived Labour government of 1924.

He was awarded the MBE in 1918.

External links 
 

1867 births
1926 deaths
Scottish Labour MPs
Members of the Parliament of the United Kingdom for Scottish constituencies
Members of the Order of the British Empire
Miners' Federation of Great Britain-sponsored MPs
UK MPs 1918–1922
UK MPs 1922–1923
UK MPs 1923–1924
UK MPs 1924–1929
Scottish miners
Scottish trade unionists